The cubit is an ancient unit of length based on the distance from the elbow to the tip of the middle finger. It was primarily associated   with the Sumerians, Egyptians, and Israelites. The term cubit is found in the Bible regarding Noah's Ark, the Ark of the Covenant, the Tabernacle, and Solomon's Temple. The common cubit was divided into 6 palms × 4 fingers = 24 digits. Royal cubits added a palm for 7 palms × 4 fingers = 28 digits.

Cubits of various lengths were employed in many parts of the world in antiquity, during the Middle Ages and as recently as early modern times. The term is still used in hedgelaying, the length of the forearm being frequently used to determine the interval between stakes placed within the hedge.

Etymology
The English word "cubit" comes from the Latin noun  "elbow", from the verb  "to lie down", from which also comes the adjective "recumbent".

Ancient Egyptian royal cubit

The ancient Egyptian royal cubit is the earliest attested standard measure. Cubit rods were used for the measurement of length. A number of these rods have survived: two are known from the tomb of Maya, the treasurer of the 18th dynasty pharaoh Tutankhamun, in Saqqara; another was found in the tomb of Kha (TT8) in Thebes. Fourteen such rods, including one double cubit rod, were described and compared by Lepsius in 1865.

Early evidence for the use of this royal cubit comes from the Early Dynastic Period: on the Palermo Stone, the flood level of the Nile river during the reign of the Pharaoh Djer is given as measuring 6 cubits and 1 palm. Use of the royal cubit is also known from Old Kingdom architecture, from at least as early as the construction of the Step Pyramid of Djoser designed by Imhotep in around 2700 BC.

Ancient Mesopotamian units of measurement

Ancient Mesopotamian units of measurement originated in the loosely organized city-states of Early Dynastic Sumer.  Each city, kingdom and trade guild had its own standards until the formation of the Akkadian Empire when Sargon of Akkad issued a common standard.  This standard was improved by Naram-Sin, but fell into disuse after the Akkadian Empire dissolved.  The standard of Naram-Sin was readopted in the Ur III period by the Nanše Hymn which reduced a plethora of multiple standards to a few agreed upon common groupings.  Successors to Sumerian civilization including the Babylonians, Assyrians, and Persians continued to use these groupings.

The Classical Mesopotamian system formed the basis for Elamite, Hebrew, Urartian, Hurrian, Hittite, Ugaritic, Phoenician, Babylonian, Assyrian, Persian, Arabic, and Islamic metrologies. The Classical Mesopotamian System also has a proportional relationship, by virtue of standardized commerce, to Bronze Age Harappan and Egyptian metrologies.

In 1916, during the last years of the Ottoman Empire and in the middle of World War I, the German assyriologist Eckhard Unger found a copper-alloy bar while excavating at Nippur.

Biblical cubit

The standard of the cubit in different countries and in different ages has varied. This realization led the rabbis of the 2nd century CE to clarify the length of their cubit, saying that the measure of the cubit of which they have spoken "applies to the cubit of middle-size". In this case, the requirement is to make use of a standard 6 handbreadths to each cubit, and which handbreadth was not to be confused with an outstretched palm, but rather one that was clenched and which handbreadth has the standard width of 4 fingerbreadths (each fingerbreadth being equivalent to the width of a thumb, about 2.25 cm). Epiphanius of Salamis, in his treatise On Weights and Measures, describes how it was customary, in his day, to take the measurement of the biblical cubit: "The cubit is a measure, but it is taken from the measure of the forearm. For the part from the elbow to the wrist and the palm of the hand is called the cubit, the middle finger of the cubit measure being also extended at the same time and there being added below (it) the span, that is, of the hand, taken all together."

Rabbi and philosopher Maimonides, following the Talmud, makes a distinction between the cubit of 6 handbreadths used in ordinary measurements, and the cubit of 5 handbreadths used in measuring the Golden Altar, the base of the altar of burnt offerings, its circuit and the horns of the altar.

Ancient Greece 

Ancient Rome
In ancient Rome, according to Vitruvius, a cubit was equal to  Roman feet or 6 palm widths (approximately ). A 120-centimeter cubit (approximately four feet long), called the Roman ulna, was common in the Roman empire, which cubit was measured from the fingers of the outstretched arm opposite the man's hip.; also, with

Islamic world
In the Islamic world, the cubit had a similar origin, being originally defined as the arm from the elbow to the tip of the middle finger. The most commonly used definitions were:
 the legal cubit, also known as the hand cubit, cubit of Yusuf (named after the 8th-century  Abu Yusuf), postal cubit, "freed" cubit and thread cubit. It measured , although in the Abbasid Caliphate it measured , possibly as a result of reforms of Caliph al-Ma'mun.
It is also known as the common cubit, sack-cloth cubit, and was the most commonly used in the Maghreb and Islamic Spain under the name .
 the king's cubit, inherited from the Sassanid Persians. It was this measure used by Ziyad ibn Abihi for his survey of Iraq, and is hence also known as Ziyadi cubit or survey cubit. From Caliph al-Mansur it was also known as the Hashemite cubit.
 the cloth cubit, which fluctuated widely according to region: the Egyptian cubit  ( or ) measured , that of Damascus , that of Aleppo , that of Baghdad , and that of Istanbul .

"Druid's cubit"

The 18th century physician and antiquarian William Stukeley proposed that a unit he called the "Druid's cubit" had been used by the builders of megalithic monuments such as Stonehenge and Avebury.

Other systems
Other measurements based on the length of the forearm include some lengths of ell, the Chinese , the Japanese , the Indian , the Thai , the Malay , the Tamil , the Telugu , the Khmer , and the Tibetan .

Cubit arm in heraldry

A cubit arm in heraldry may be dexter or sinister. It may be  vested (with a sleeve) and may be shown in various positions, most commonly erect, but also fesswise (horizontal), bendwise (diagonal) and is often shown grasping objects.  It is most often used erect as a crest, for example by the families of Poyntz of Iron Acton, Rolle of Stevenstone and Turton.

See also
 History of measurement
 List of obsolete units of measurement
 System of measurement
 Unit of measurement

References

Bibliography 
 
.
 Petrie, Sir Flinders (1881). Pyramids and Temples of Gizeh.
 Stone, Mark H., "The Cubit: A History and Measurement Commentary", Journal of Anthropology , 2014

External links

 
 

Obsolete units of measurement
Units of length
Human-based units of measurement